Habib Bourguiba Jr. (9 April 1927 – 28 December 2009) was a Tunisian diplomat and politician.

Biography 
Jean-Claude Habib Bourguiba was the son of Habib Bourguiba, who became the first President of Tunisia in 1957, and of his first wife Mathilde Lorrain (later Moufida Bourguiba). He was appointed Tunisia's ambassador to France in November 1958. He later served as Tunisia's ambassador to the United States as well as Italy.

In 1964, Bourguiba replaced Mongi Slim as the Minister of Foreign Affairs. He served in that post until 1970. He was attending King Hassan II of Morocco's birthday celebration on 10 July 1971 when M'hamed Ababou and Mohamed Medbouh launched a coup against the King. When a grenade landed at Hassan's feet, Bourguiba threw it back before it could detonate, probably saving the King's life.

He subsequently served as the Minister of Justice until he was named by his father as a Special Counselor in 1977. He was removed from this office as part of the coup d'état on 7 November 1987 which overthrew his father's administration and brought Zine El Abidine Ben Ali to power.

He was a shareholder (2.3%) and board member of the BIAT Banque and member of the Club of Monaco. The Club of Monaco is an important organisation in Mediterranean countries.

Personal life
Bourguiba married Neïla Zouiten, the daughter of Chedly Zouiten, who was the chairman of the Tunisian Football Club, Esperance de Tunis.  They had three children:
 Mouezz Bourguiba (born March 14, 1956 in Tunis) married to Françoise Peignon and father of Amina Bourguiba (born 1985) and Aïcha Bourguiba (born 1989).
Mahdi Bourguiba: married to Sarrah Turky and the father of Jenna Bourguiba (b. 1989), Eya Bourguiba (b. 1994), Neil Bourguiba (b. 1996) and Maya Bourguiba.
Meriem Bourguiba: married to Kais Laouiti, son of Allala Laouiti, former Private Secretary to President Bourguiba: mother of Leila Laouiti (born 1989), Youssef Laouiti (born 1990) and Sarah Laouiti (born 1995)
He died in 2009, aged 82.

References

External links

1927 births
2009 deaths
Ambassadors of Tunisia to Italy
Ambassadors of Tunisia to France
Ambassadors of Tunisia to the United States
Sons of national leaders
Tunisian people of French descent
Grand Cross of the Order of Civil Merit
Knights Grand Cross of the Order of Isabella the Catholic
Foreign ministers of Tunisia
Justice ministers of Tunisia
20th-century diplomats